Arrival is the fourth studio album by British funk group Cymande. Recorded in 1974, it was released in 1981 through Paul Winley Records.

Critical reception
Record Collector wrote: "Incredibly dull ballads alternate with less-than-inspired attempts at floor-fillers, with, perhaps, only the closing 'It’s Magic', a Philly International-inspired groove, coming close to scaling the heights of earlier gems." No Depression urged readers to avoid it, writing that it was put out to "cash in on [Cymande's] club cache."

Track listing
"What's The Word  - Good Times" - 7:22
"Living For Your Love" - 5:24
"Sweet Talk" - 6:24
"Let Me Be The One" - 3:59
"Since You've Been Gone" - 4:54
"You Won't Feel So Proud" - 4:14
"Being With You" - 4:57
"It's Magic" - 3:24

References

External links
 Cymande - Arrival at Discogs

1981 albums
Cymande albums